Manjirenji Dam, formerly known as Lake McDougal, lies in south eastern Zimbabwe, east of Masvingo.  It was built to provide irrigation water to the farming estates on the lowveld to the southwest, around the town of Chiredzi, where the main crop has been sugar cane.

The lake and environs are protected as Manjirenji Dam Recreational Park.

References

Masvingo
Buildings and structures in Masvingo Province
Dams in Zimbabwe
Dams completed in 1967